The 2021–22 season was the 64th season in the existence of PFC Krylia Sovetov Samara and the club's 19th consecutive season in the top flight of Russian football. In addition to the domestic league, PFC Krylia Sovetov Samara are participating in this season's editions of the Russian Cup.

Players

Out on loan

Transfers

In

Loans in

Out

Loans out

Released

Friendlies

Competitions

Overview

Premier League

League table

Results summary

Results by round

Matches

Russian Cup

Round of 32

Squad statistics

Appearances and goals

|-
|colspan="14"|Players away from the club on loan:
|-
|colspan="14"|Players who appeared for Krylia Sovetov but left during the season:

|}

Goal scorers

Clean sheets

Disciplinary record

References

PFC Krylia Sovetov Samara seasons
PFC Krylia Sovetov Samara